Solontsy is a rural locality (a selo) and the administrative center of Solonetskoye Rural Settlement, Vorobyovsky District, Voronezh Oblast, Russia. The population was 739 as of 2010. There are 8 streets.

Geography 
Solontsy is located 21 km west of Vorobyovka (the district's administrative centre) by road. Kamenka is the nearest rural locality.

References 

Rural localities in Vorobyovsky District